The Netherlands Football League Championship 1889–1890 was contested by seven teams from the cities Amsterdam, The Hague, Haarlem and Rotterdam. The teams participated in the competition that would later be called Eerste Klasse West. But since the western football district of the Netherlands was the only one to have a competition at the time, it could be regarded as a national championship. Koninklijke HFC from Haarlem won the championship, however this championship was not official, since the teams had not played an equal number of matches.

League standings

Results

References

RSSSF Netherlands Football League Championships 1898-1954

Netherlands
Netherlands Football League Championship seasons